Nana Kwame Abrokwa (born 5 October 1968) is a Ghanaian born German rapper and DJ, performing under the pseudonyms Nana or Darkman. Nana is not an actual first name, but is rather a Ghanaian title of nobility. His 1996 self-titled debut album was certified Platinum in Poland and Gold in Germany and Switzerland. The album spawned the 1997 hit single, "Lonely", which reached number-one in Germany and Switzerland, and was certified Platinum in Germany.

Early life
Nana arrived in Hamburg, Germany, with his mother and his brothers at the age of 10.

Musical career

Beginnings
At the beginning of the 90s, his debut consisted of DJing in hip-hop clubs. He also co-produced and rapped in some songs of DJ David Fascher ("Here We Go", "Make The Crowd Go Wild"), under the alias MC Africa True.

1995: Eurodance project and departure
In 1995 he joined the Eurodance project Darkness as a rapper, which was produced by Bülent Aris and Toni Cottura. The song "Dreams" became a club hit, but Nana did not feel very comfortable with the style Darkness adopted and the group separated. However, his current scene name, Darkman, originated from this time.

1996-1997: Debut album and commercial success
In 1996 Aris and Cottura founded the Black Music label Booya Music, which Nana joined as the first artist. The first single, "Darkman" reached the top 10 of Germany's official single-chart  by Media Control. The following single, "Lonely", became the most successful euro-rap song, being number-one for several weeks. The album, Nana, released in 1997, is more on the mainstream, American style of rapping. It features numerous other members of the Booya Family, such as Jan van der Toorn and Alex Prince.

1998: Father
The second album, Father, was released in May 1998 and contains slower pieces and more personal lyrics. The songs "Too Much Heaven" and "War" were also featured on the tribute albums Love The Bee Gees and Hands on Motown.

1999-2004: Single releases and hiatus
At the end of 1999, Nana's released the single "I Wanna Fly", which flopped, due to a decrease in euro-rap's popularity and the growing importance of hip-hop played in German. Nevertheless, Nana still recorded two further albums with Booya Music, which were not released due to legal problems.

At the beginning of 2001 Nana released the German-language song Du wirst sehen, a gesture which was not appreciated by international fans. The single flopped, and the planned bilingual album Global Playa was canceled at the request of the record company.

2004: All Doors in Flight No. 7
After a long break, in the summer of 2004, Nana finally released the album All Doors In Flight No. 7, featuring Jan van der Toorn and Manuell, on his own label, Darkman Records. The album was distributed exclusively over the Internet, through Nana's website.

2022: Team Darkman The Storm After the Calm
After the Covid pandemic, Nana skyrocketed back into touring across Europe around August 2022 with his newly appointed official backing singer Polish R&B singer-songwriter Graciano Markowski known as  Graciano Major .
Touring and live performances were not the only type of collaborations between Nana and Graciano Major, they both work together in the studio and have released a song in 2021 under the name “One Night Stand”, under his own Label Darkman Records. . The single was distributed over the Internet, through all major digital streaming platforms, and Graciano Major joined hands with talented Lebanese Electronic music producer and DJ Ramzy Shaar to remix his single “Dubai” in October 2022, released under the Label ‘’’Cat Music’’’.. The Ramzy Shaar official remix of Dubai single is being performed live by Graciano Major during his performances with Nana.

Discography

Studio albums

Singles

Awards 
 1997: Comet Award for "Best German debut"
 1998: ECHO for "Most successful German debut"
 1998: ECHO for "Most successful German artist"
 1998: Comet Award for "Best German act"

Notes

External links
 Official website

1968 births
German rappers
Ghanaian rappers
Living people
Eurodance musicians
Echo (music award) winners